Michael Sledge (born June 28, 1962) is an American novelist and non-fiction writer. He has published the memoir Mother and Son (1995) and the novel The More I Owe You (2010), which was a finalist for the Los Angeles Times Book Prize. In 2007, he moved to Oaxaca, Mexico, where he runs the cultural programs of the Ex-Hacienda Guadalupe.

Biography 
Born in Houston, Texas, Sledge attended St. John's School and graduated from Stanford University with a degree in literature and biological sciences. He received an MFA in Writing from the Columbia School of the Arts in 1991.

Writing 
The culture of 1970s Texas and his own blended family served as the inspiration for Sledge's memoir Mother and Son, which People Magazine called "inspiring and unforgettable." His debut novel The More I Owe You explores the years Elizabeth Bishop spent in Brazil in the 1950s and ‘60s with the Brazilian artist and architect Lota de Macedo Soares. The More I Owe You won the Ferro-Grumley Award in 2011 and was a finalist for the Los Angeles Times First Fiction Award, a Lambda Literary Award, and the Northern California Book Awards. It was also chosen as a 2011 Stonewall Honor Book in Literature. Sledge presented the novel at the 2011 Paraty International Book Fair in Paraty, Brazil.

In 2022, Sledge will publish Al Sur, Cronica del Valle Encantado, about his experiences in Mexico.

Mexico

In 2007, Sledge moved to Oaxaca, Mexico to co-found Oaxifornia, an exchange between Oaxacan artisans and U.S. art students. Oaxifornia is one among a number of cultural programs—which also include art residencies, academic stays, and culinary research—that Sledge sponsors at the Ex-Hacienda Guadalupe in the town of San Jeronimo Tlacochahuaya.

Bibliography 
Mother and Son, New York: Simon & Schuster. 1995.
The More I Owe You, Berkeley, CA: Counterpoint Press.  2010.
Al Sur, Cronica del Valle Encantado, Mexico City: Editorial Turner. TBP 2022.

References 
1.     ^ "Novelist Sledge finds oneness with poet Bishop". SFGate.com, August 31, 2010.

2.     ^ "Questions of Travel". The New York Times, July 9, 2010.

3.     ^ "Publishing Triangle Award Winners". Lambda Literary Foundation, April 29, 2011.

4.     ^ "Lambda Literary Awards Finalists Unveiled". Adweek, March 16, 2011.

5.     ^ Jump up to:a b "Mother and Son: A Memoir". Publishers Weekly, September 4, 1995.

20th-century American non-fiction writers
21st-century American novelists
American male novelists
American memoirists
American LGBT novelists
Gay memoirists
American gay writers
Writers from Houston
Living people
20th-century American male writers
21st-century American male writers
Novelists from Texas
21st-century American non-fiction writers
American male non-fiction writers
1962 births